Pathum Thani is a town in central Thailand, directly north of Bangkok.

Pathum Thani may also refer to:
 Pathum Thani province
 Mueang Pathum Thani district